The Spring and Autumn Annals is an ancient Chinese chronicle that has been one of the core Chinese classics since ancient times.  The Annals is the official chronicle of the State of Lu, and covers a 241-year period from 722 to 481 BC.  It is the earliest surviving Chinese historical text to be arranged in annals form.   Because it was traditionally regarded as having been compiled by Confucius (after a claim to this effect by Mencius), it was included as one of the Five Classics of Chinese literature.  

The Annals records main events that occurred in Lu during each year, such as the accessions, marriages, deaths, and funerals of rulers, battles fought, sacrificial rituals observed, celestial phenomena considered ritually important, and natural disasters.  The entries are tersely written, averaging only 10 characters per entry, and contain no elaboration on events or recording of speeches.

During the Warring States period (475221), a number of commentaries to the Annals were created that attempted to elaborate on or find deeper meaning in the brief entries in the Annals.  The Commentary of Zuo, the best known of these commentaries, became a classic in its own right, and is the source of more Chinese sayings and idioms than any other classical work.

History and content
The Spring and Autumn Annals was likely composed in the 5th century BC.  By the time of Confucius, in the 6th century BC, the term "springs and autumns" (chūnqiū , Old Chinese *tʰun tsʰiw) had come to mean "year" and was probably becoming a generic term for "annals" or "scribal records".  The Annals was not the only work of its kind, as many other Eastern Zhou states also kept annals in their archives.

The Annals is a succinct scribal record, with terse entries that record events such as the accessions, marriages, deaths, and funerals of rulers, battles fought, sacrificial records observed, natural disasters, and celestial phenomena believed to be of ritual significance.  The entries average only 10 characters in length; the longest entry in the entire work is only 47 characters long, and a number of the entries are only a single character long.  There are 11 entries that read simply *tung , meaning "a plague of insects" (probably locusts).

Some modern scholars have questioned whether the entries were ever originally intended as a chronicle for human readers, and have suggested that the Annals entries may have been intended as "ritual messages directed primarily to the ancestral spirits."

Commentaries
Since the text of this book is terse and its contents limited, a number of commentaries were composed to annotate the text, and explain and expand on its meanings. The Book of Han vol. 30 lists five commentaries:

 The Commentary of Zou
 The Commentary of Jia
 The Commentary of Gongyang
 The Commentary of Guliang
 The Commentary of Zuo (also known as )

No text of the Zou or Jia commentaries has survived. The surviving commentaries are known collectively as the Three Commentaries on the Spring and Autumn Annals. Both the Book of Han and the Records of the Grand Historian provide detailed accounts of the origins of the three texts.

The Gongyang and Guliang commentaries were compiled during the 2nd-century BC, although modern scholars had suggested they probably incorporate earlier written and oral traditions of explanation from the period of Warring States. They are based upon different editions of the Spring and Autumn Annals, and are phrased as questions and answers.

The Commentary of Zuo, also known as the Zuo Zhuan, composed in the early 4th-century BC, is a general history covering the period from 722 to 468 BC which follows the succession of the rulers of the State of Lu. In the 3rd-century AD, the Chinese scholar Du Yu interpolated the Zuo Zhuan with the Annals so that each entry of the Annals was followed by the corresponding passages of the Zuo Zhuan. Du Yu's version of the text was the basis for the "Right Meaning of the Annals" which became the imperially authorised text and commentary on the Annals in 653 AD.

Influence
The Annals is one of the core Chinese classics and had an enormous influence on Chinese intellectual discourse for nearly 2,500 years.  This was due to Mencius' assertion in the 4th century that Confucius himself edited the Annals, an assertion which was accepted by the entire Chinese scholarly tradition and went almost entirely unchallenged until the early 20th century. The Annals''' terse style was interpreted as Confucius' deliberate attempt to convey "lofty principles in subtle words".  Not all scholars accepted this explanation: Tang dynasty historiographer Liu Zhiji believed the Commentary of Zuo was far superior to the Annals, and Song dynasty prime minister Wang Anshi famously dismissed the Annals as "a fragmentary court gazette".  Many Western scholars have given similar evaluations: the French sinologist Édouard Chavannes referred to the Annals as "an arid and dead chronicle".  

The Annals have become so evocative of the era in which they were composed that it is now widely referred to as the Spring and Autumn period.

Translations

  (part 1 and part 2 at the Internet Archive; also with Pinyin transliterations here).
  Reprinted (1951), Paris: Cathasia.
 
 Watson, Burton (1989). The Tso Chuan: Selections from China's Oldest Narrative History. New York: Columbia University Press.
 Miller, Harry (2015). The Gongyang Commentary on the Spring and Autumn Annals: A Full Translation. New York: Palgrave Macmillan.

See also

Guliang zhuan 
Gongyang zhan 
Zuo zhuan 
Bamboo annals 
Spring and Autumn Annals of yanzi

Note

References

Works cited

External links
 
 
 
Full text of Spring and Autumn Annals (Chinese)
Chinese Literature – Spring and Autumn Annals Chinaknowledge.de

Chinese history texts
Chinese classic texts
Confucian texts
5th-century BC history books
Chinese chronicles
Works of unknown authorship
Zhou dynasty texts
Lu (state)
Four Books and Five Classics